Burji language (alternate names: Bembala, Bambala, Daashi) is an Afro-Asiatic language spoken by the Burji people who reside in Ethiopia south of Lake Chamo. There are over 49,000 speakers in Ethiopia, and a further 36,900 speakers in Kenya. Burji belongs to the Highland East Cushitic group of the Cushitic branch of the Afro-Asiatic family.

The language has the SOV (subject–object–verb) word order common to the Cushitic family. The verb morphology distinguishes passive and middle grammatical voice, as well as causative. Verbal suffixes mark the person, number, and gender of the subject.

The New Testament was published in the Burji language in 1993. A collection of Burji proverbs, translated into English, French, and Swahili, is available on the Web.

Numerals 1-1000
 1. micha
 2. lama
 3. fadiya
 4. foola
 5. umutta
 6. liya
 7. lamala
 8. hiditta
 9. wonfa
 10. tanna
11. Tannaya micha
12. Tannaya lama
13. Tannaya fadiya
14. Tannaya foola
15. Tannaya umutta
16. Tannaya liya
17. Tannaya lamala
18. Tannaya hiditta
19. Tannaya wonfa
20. Lamattann
30. Fadiitann
40. Foolattan
50. Umuttan
60. Liittan
70. Lamalattan
80. Hidittan
90. Wonfattan
100. Ch'ibba.
1,000. Kuma

Notes

References 
 Amborn, Hermann, and Alexander Kellner. 1999. "Burji Vocabulary of Cultural Items. An Insight into Burji culture. Based on the field notes of Helmut Straube," Afrikanistische Arbeitspapiere 58: 5-67.
 Sasse, Hans-Jürgen. 1982. An Etymological Dictionary of Burji (Kuschitische Sprachstudien 1). Hamburg: Buske. 
 Sasse, Hans-Jürgen and Helmut Straube. 1977. "Kultur und Sprache der Burji," Süd-Aethiopien: Ein Abriss, Zur Sprachgeschichte und Ethnohistorie in Afrika. Ed. Wilhelm J. G. Moehlig, Franz Rottland and Bernd Heine.  Berlin.  Pages 239–266.
 Wedekind, Charlotte. 1985. "Burji verb morphology and morphophonemics," The verb morphophonemics of five highland east Cushitic languages, including Burji.  Afrikanistische Arbeitspapiere 2. Cologne: Institut für Afrikanistik.  Pages 110–145.
 Wedekind, Klaus. 1980. "Sidamo, Darasa (Gedeo), Burji: phonological differences and likenesses," Journal of Ethiopian Studies 14:131-176.

External links 
 World Atlas of Language Structures information on Burji

Languages of Kenya
Languages of Ethiopia
East Cushitic languages
Subject–object–verb languages